The Department of Community Services and Health was an Australian government department that existed between July 1987 and June 1991.

History
The Department of Community Services and Health was one of 16 'super-ministries' announced as part of a major restructuring of the administration and economy by Prime Minister Bob Hawke in July 1987. The department was an amalgamation of the Department of Community Services and the Department of Health.

Scope
Information about the department's functions and/or government funding allocation could be found in the Administrative Arrangements Orders, the annual Portfolio Budget Statements and in the department's annual reports.

At its creation, the department was responsible for:
Services for the aged, people with disabilities and families with children 
Community support services
Housing assistance
Public health, research and preventive medicine
Community health projects
Health promotion
Pharmaceutical benefits
Health benefits schemes
Human quarantine
National drug abuse strategy

Structure
The department was an Australian Public Service department, staffed by officials who were responsible to the Minister for Community Services and Health, first Neal Blewett (until April 1990) and then Brian Howe.

The Secretary of the department was initially Tony Ayers (until July 1988) and then Stuart Hamilton.

References

1987 establishments in Australia
1991 disestablishments in Australia
Community Services and Health
Ministries established in 1987